Allan Fayan Alves Rodrigues de Moura (born 20 March 1990) is a Brazilian football midfielder who plays for LAAC. He played on the Portuguese second tier for Freamunde.

References

1990 births
Living people
Brazilian footballers
Esporte Clube Itaúna players
Associação Desportiva Recreativa e Cultural Icasa players
Associação Atlética Internacional (Bebedouro) players
Anadia F.C. players
S.C. Espinho players
S.C. Freamunde players
AD Oliveirense players
FC Pampilhosa players
G.D. Gafanha players
Association football midfielders
Liga Portugal 2 players
Brazilian expatriate footballers
Expatriate footballers in Portugal
Brazilian expatriate sportspeople in Portugal